Jean Pommat (30 August 1944 – 24 March 2006) was a French freestyle swimmer who competed in the 1960 Summer Olympics. He was born in Aubervilliers.

References

External links 
 

1944 births
2006 deaths
French male freestyle swimmers
Olympic swimmers of France
Swimmers at the 1960 Summer Olympics
Mediterranean Games gold medalists for France
Swimmers at the 1963 Mediterranean Games
Mediterranean Games medalists in swimming